Carl Edward King-Millward (17 July 1935 in Bedfordshire, United Kingdom – August 2000) was a British mathematician.  He became head of applied mathematics at the Institute of Historical Research in London in 1965, thus becoming the youngest non-literary scholar to do so in the post-war era.

King-Millward's parents were of Slavonic extraction, moving to Britain in 1933.

References

1935 births
2000 deaths
20th-century English mathematicians
People from Bedfordshire